Qarah Karselu (also Romanized as Qarah Karselū; also known as Ghara Koosloo, Kara-Kusalu, Qarā Gosālū, Qarā Kūsalū, Qareh Kosālū, Qareh Kūsehlar, and Qareh Kūslū) is a village in Qaqazan-e Sharqi Rural District, in the Central District of Takestan County, Qazvin Province, Iran. At the 2006 census, its population was 10, in 4 families.

References 

Populated places in Takestan County